The Kauai Railway is a former narrow gauge railway company in Hawaii, United States. It did not have a connection to the other common carrier railway on the island, the Ahukini Terminal and Railway, although both were built to the same track gauge. Almost all railway trackage on Kauai was connected together due to an agreement with the U.S. Government to interconnect the common carriers and sugarcane plantation railways. The government imposed this as a condition before they would agree to improve the port of Nawiliwili for oceangoing ships. The line was opened 1907. In 1936 the company name was changed to the Kauai Terminal Company. The last train ran 1947, with rail operations replaced by trucks. The company continues to exist as the present-day Kauai Commercial Company.

References 
 Drury, George H. (2007) "Hawaiian Railroads", in: William D. Middleton, George M. Smerk, Roberta L. Diehl (eds.): Encyclopedia of North American Railroads. Indiana University Press, Bloomington IN/Indianapolis IN. 
 Walker, Mike. 1998 Comprehensive Railroad Atlas of North America. Pacific Northwest.
 Conde, Jesse C. 1973 Sugar Trains. Big Trees Press.

External links 
 Kauai Commercial Company (Official site)

2 ft 6 in gauge railways in Hawaii
Defunct Hawaii railroads
Transportation in Kauai County, Hawaii
Railway companies established in 1906
1906 establishments in Hawaii
Railway companies disestablished in 1947
1947 disestablishments in Hawaii
American companies established in 1906
American companies disestablished in 1947